Attilio Pusterla (Milan, Italy, 1862 – Woodcliff, New Jersey, United States, 1941) was an Italian painter.

Biography
By 1880, he attended the Brera Academy alongside Filippo Carcano, Emilio Longoni, and Angelo Morbelli. He allied himself to the style and subjects of Vittore Grubicy, and resided in Milan.

He was a resident of Milan. In 1883 in Milan and Rome, he exhibited Effetto di sole. Also in Rome, he displayed another canvas depicting Motterone sul Lago Maggiore. At the 1886 Promotrice (and in 1887 in Venice) he sent Vecchio pescatore, La questua dei poreri, and Dopo una predica (After the Sermon). At 1886 in Milan, he sent Portrait of his father and Portrait of painter Gustavo Macchi. He then began painting genre figures of contemporary working class life, including Cucine Economiche, An English Marriage in a Cemetery, and the Bevitrici di Sangue.

His social content did not gain him economic success, and by 1900 he had moved to the United States. Among his works in North America were some of the frescoes on the Astoria Column in Oregon, as well as frescoes in the Senate Banking & Commerce Committee Room and in the House of Commons in Ottawa. Pusterla, as part of WPA-sponsored projects employing artists, directed much of the frescoes for the New York County Supreme Courthouse on Foley Square.

References

External links  

1862 births
1941 deaths
Painters from Milan
Italian genre painters
19th-century Italian painters
Italian male painters
20th-century Italian painters
Brera Academy alumni
Italian emigrants to the United States
19th-century Italian male artists
20th-century Italian male artists